Parama Chinas were a kingdom to the north east of the Himalayas. The Parama Chinas were mentioned in Mahabharata along with another kingdom named China.

See also 
Kingdoms of Ancient India

References 

Mahabharata of Krishna Dwaipayana Vyasa, translated to English by Kisari Mohan Ganguli

Kingdoms in the Mahabharata